Vetluzhsky is an urban locality (an urban-type settlement) in Kostroma Oblast, Russia. Population:

Administrative and municipal status
Within the framework of administrative divisions, Vetluzhsky, as an administrative division, together with the town of Sharya and three rural localities, incorporated separately as the town of oblast significance of Sharya—an administrative unit with the status equal to that of the districts. As a municipal division, Vetluzhsky, as part of the town of oblast significance of Sharya, is incorporated as Sharya Urban Okrug.

References

Urban-type settlements in Kostroma Oblast
Sharya Urban Okrug